The Illinois House of Representatives is the lower house of the Illinois General Assembly.  The body was created by the first Illinois Constitution adopted in 1818.  The House under the current constitution as amended in 1980 consists of 118 representatives elected from individual legislative districts for two-year terms with no limits; redistricted every 10 years, based on the 2010 U.S. census each representative represents approximately 108,734 people.

The house has the power to pass bills and impeach Illinois officeholders. Lawmakers must be at least 21 years of age and a resident of the district in which they serve for at least two years.

President Abraham Lincoln began his career in politics in the Illinois House of Representatives.

History
The Illinois General Assembly was created by the first Illinois Constitution adopted in 1818. The candidates for office split into political parties in the 1830s, initially as the Democratic and Whig parties, until the Whig candidates reorganized as Republicans in the 1850s.

Abraham Lincoln began his political career in the Illinois House of Representatives as a member of the Whig party in 1834. He served there until 1842. Although Republicans held the majority of seats in the Illinois House after 1860, in the next election it returned to the Democrats. The Democratic Party-led legislature worked to frame a new state constitution that was ultimately rejected by voters After the 1862 election, the Democratic-led Illinois House of Representatives passed resolutions denouncing the federal government's conduct of the war and urging an immediate armistice and peace convention, leading the Republican governor to suspend the legislature for the first time in the state's history. In 1864, Republicans swept the state legislature and at the time of Lincoln's assassination at Ford's Theater, Illinois stood as a solidly Republican state.

State House of Representatives elected through Cumulative voting from 1870 to 1980. The use of that system was meant to secure a degree of representation for minority blacks and the non-dominant party through use of multi-member districts and special type of multiple voting.

From 1870 to 1980, Illinois's lower house had several unique features:
The House comprised 177 members. The state was divided into 59 legislative districts, each of which elected one senator and three representatives.
Elections for the state house were conducted using cumulative voting; each individual voter was given three votes to cast for House seats, and they could distribute them to three candidates (one vote each), one candidate (receiving three votes—this was called a bullet vote) or two candidates (each receiving 1½ votes).
Though not constitutionally mandated, the two parties had an informal agreement that they would only run two candidates per district. Thus, in most districts, only four candidates were running for three seats. This not only all but guaranteed that the district's minority party would win a seat (particularly outside Chicago), but usually assured that each party would have significant representation—a minimum of one-third of the seats (59 out of 177)—in the House.

Cutback Amendment of 1980
The Cutback Amendment was proposed to abolish Illinois's use of Cumulative Voting and multi-member districts.

Since its passage in 1980, representatives have been elected from 118 single-member districts formed by dividing the 59 Senate districts in half, a method known as nesting. Each senator is "associated" with two representatives.

Since the adoption of the Cutback Amendment, there have been proposals by some major political figures in Illinois to bring back multi-member districts.  A task force led by former governor Jim Edgar and former federal judge Abner Mikva issued a report in 2001 calling for the revival of cumulative voting, in part because it appears that such a system increases the representation of racial minorities in elected office.  The Chicago Tribune editorialized in 1995 that the multi-member districts elected with cumulative voting produced better legislators.  Others have argued that the now-abandoned system provided for greater stability in the lower house.

The Democratic Party won a majority of House seats in 1982. Except for a brief two-year period of Republican control from 1995 to 1997, the Democrats have held the majority since then.

Firsts
The first two African-American legislators in Illinois were John W. E. Thomas, first elected in 1876, and George French Ecton, elected in 1886. In 1922, Lottie Holman O'Neill became the first woman elected to the Illinois House of Representatives. In 1958, Floy Clements became the first African American woman to serve as state Representative. In 1982, Joseph Berrios became the first Hispanic American state representative. Theresa Mah became the first Asian American to serve in the Illinois House when she was sworn into office January 10, 2017.

Powers
The Illinois House of Representatives meets at the Illinois State Capitol in Springfield, Illinois. It is required to convene on the second Wednesday of January each year. Along with the Illinois Senate and governor, it is vested with the power to make laws, come up with a state budget, act on federal constitutional amendments, and propose constitutional amendments to the state constitution. The Illinois House of Representatives also holds the power to impeach executive and judicial officials.

Qualifications
A person must be a U.S. citizen and two-year resident of an electoral district of at least 21 years of age to serve in the Illinois House of Representatives. Members of the House cannot hold other public offices or receive appointments by the governor while in office.

Composition of the House

Leadership
The current Speaker of the Illinois House of Representatives is Emanuel Chris Welch, a Democrat from Hillside, who represents the 7th district. The Democratic Party of Illinois currently holds a supermajority of seats in the House. Under the Constitution of Illinois, the office of minority leader is recognized for the purpose of making certain appointments. Tony McCombie, of Savanna, who represents the 89th district, currently holds that post. Both leaders appointed their leadership teams shortly after the start of the 103rd General Assembly.

Majority
 Speaker of the House: Emanuel Chris Welch
 Majority Leader: Robyn Gabel
 Deputy Majority Leaders:
 Mary E. Flowers
 Jehan Gordon-Booth
 Elizabeth Hernandez
 Assistant Majority Leaders:

 Marcus C. Evans Jr.
 Robyn Gabel
 Jay Hoffman
 Natalie Manley
 Aaron Ortiz
 Kam Buckner
 Barbara Hernandez
 Kelly Burke
 Robert Rita
 Majority Conference Chairperson: Theresa Mah
 Majority Officer & Sergeant at Arms: Nick Smith

Minority
 Minority Leader: Tony McCombie
 Deputy Minority Leaders:
 Norine Hammond
 Ryan Spain
Assistant Minority Leaders:
 John Cabello
 Charles Meier
 Mike Marron
 C. D. Davidsmeyer
 Jackie Haas
 Minority Conference Chairperson: Jeff Keicher
 Minority Floor Leader: Patrick Windhorst

Officers
Clerk of the House: John W. Hollman
Chief Doorkeeper: Lee A. Crawford
Parliamentarian: James Hartmann
Assistant Clerk of the House: Bradley S. Bolin

Members

, the 103rd General Assembly of the Illinois House of Representatives consists of the following members:

Ɨ Legislator was appointed to the Illinois House of Representatives during session.
ƗƗ Legislator was appointed to the Illinois House of Representatives after being elected, but prior to inauguration day of the General Assembly to which they were elected.

Past composition of the House of Representatives

References

External links

Illinois General Assembly - House official government website
Illinois House Republicans official party website
Illinois House Democrats official party website
 Legislature of Illinois at Project Vote Smart
Illinois campaign financing at FollowTheMoney.org

House
State lower houses in the United States
1818 establishments in Illinois Territory